Stoyanka Savova Nikolova, best known by her stage name Elena Nicolai (24 January 1905 – 24 October 1993), was a Bulgarian operatic mezzo-soprano.

Early life and training 
Nicolai was born in the village of Tzerovo, Pazardzhik, Bulgaria. She spent her childhood in another Bulgarian town, Panagurishte. At the age of 19, she moved to Milan to study opera, first with Vincenzo Pintorno and later with Ettore Pozzoli.

Operatic career 

She made her operatic debut as Maddalena in Verdi's Rigoletto in 1932. She spent 20 seasons as a leading mezzo-soprano at Milan's Teatro alla Scala.  After her retirement from opera, she became an actress and had a short film career, starring in seven movies in the period between 1963-68.

She recorded complete operas for RAI and EMI:  Eboli in Don Carlos with Antonietta Stella, Boris Christoff, and Tito Gobbi stands out among the others, which include the Grand Vestale in La vestale and Cuniza in Oberto, both with Maria Vitale, Santuzza in Cavalleria rusticana with Mario del Monaco, the Principessa in Adriana Lecouvreur with Mafalda Favero, and Preziosilla in La forza del destino with Callas. She sang Wagnerian roles, including Brünnhilde in Die Walküre at the Verona Arena, according to her interview with Lanfranco Rasponi in his book, The Last Prima Donnas.

Roles sung 
 Annina, Der Rosenkavalier
 Laura, La Gioconda (opera)
 La Cieca, La Gioconda (opera)
 Nefte, Il figliuol prodigo (List of operas by Ponchielli)
 Principessa di Bouillon, Adriana Lecouvreur (opera)
 Rubria, Nerone (Boito)
 Ortrud, Lohengrin (opera)
 Dalila, Samson and Delilah (opera)
 Brunnhilde, Die Walkure
 Amneris, Aida
 Eboli, Don Carlo
 Azucena, Il Trovatore
 Adalgisa, Norma
 Leonora, La Favorita 
 Carmen, Carmen
 Brangaene, Tristan und Isolde
 Santuzza, Cavalleria Rusticana
 Fedora, Fedora
 Klytaemnestra, Elektra

Recordings 

 Monteverdi - L'Orfeo (Silvia, 1939) conducted by Ferrucio Calusio, Italian HMV
 Cilea - Adriana Lecouvreur (Principessa di Bouillon, 1949) conducted by Federico Del Cupolo, Colosseum
 Mascagni - Cavalleria rusticana (Santuzza, 1953) conducted by Franco Ghione, Decca
 Verdi - Don Carlo (Principessa d'Eboli, 1954) conducted by Gabriele Santini, HMV/EMI
 Verdi - La forza del destino (Preziosilla, 1954) conducted by Tullio Serafin, Columbia/EMI

Films 
 Il boom, directed by Vittorio De Sica (1963)
 La mia signora (episode "I miei cari," directed by Mauro Bolognini) (1964)
 Sedotti e bidonati, directed by Giorgio Bianchi (1964)
 Gli amanti latini (episode "L'irreparabile," directed by Mario Costa) (1965)
 I nostri mariti (episode "Il marito di Roberta," directed by Luigi Filippo D'Amico) (1966)
 Quando dico che ti amo, directed by Giorgio Bianchi (1967)
 Il medico della mutua, directed by Luigi Zampa (1968)

Honours
Nicolai Peak in Antarctica is named after Elena Nicolai.

Bibliography

References

External links
 Her page on the Stars of Bulgarian Opera site with mp3 audio clips of selected arias
 

1905 births
1993 deaths
Bulgarian emigrants to Italy
20th-century Bulgarian women opera singers
Operatic mezzo-sopranos
People from Panagyurishte
Place of death missing
Bulgarian mezzo-sopranos